Insights is the fourth studio recording of the Toshiko Akiyoshi – Lew Tabackin Big Band and was voted "Jazz Album of the Year" in the 1978 Down Beat magazine critic's poll.  It received the Swing Journal magazine 1976 Gold Disk prize in Japan and was nominated for a 1978 Grammy award in the USA for Best Jazz Instrumental Performance by a Big Band.

All tracks from this album are also included on the 2008 Mosaic 3 CD compilation, Mosaic Select: Toshiko Akiyoshi - Lew Tabackin Big Band.

Track listing
All songs composed and arranged by Toshiko Akiyoshi:
LP side A
"Studio J" – 6:07 
"Transience" – 4:40  
"SUMIE" – 7:55   
LP side B
"Minamata" (suite) – 21:36 
"Peaceful Village"
"Prosperity & Consequence"
"Epilogue"

Personnel
Toshiko Akiyoshi – piano
Lew Tabackin – tenor saxophone and flute
Tom Peterson – tenor saxophone
Dick Spencer – alto saxophone
Gary Foster – alto saxophone
Bill Perkins –  baritone saxophone
Steven Huffsteter – trumpet 
Bobby Shew – trumpet
Mike Price – trumpet
Richard Cooper – trumpet (except on "Minamata")
Jerry Hey – trumpet (on "Minamata")
Bill Reichenbach Jr. – trombone 
Charlie Loper – trombone 
Britt Woodman – trombone 
Phil Teele – bass trombone 
Don Baldwin – bass   
Peter Donald – drums

Guest Artists:
Hisao Kanze – utai / Nō chant (on "Minamata") 
Tadao Kamei – ōtsuzumi (on "Minamata") 
Hayao Uzawa – kotsuzumi (on "Minamata")
(Monday) Michiru Mariano – voice (on "Minamata")
 Hiromitsu Katada – kakko (on "SUMIE")

References / External Links
RCA Victor Records RVC RVP-6106
[ Allmusic]
1978 Down Beat critic's poll award winners
1978 Grammy nomination, Best Jazz Instrumental Performance - Big Band (LA Times link)
1976 Swing Journal Gold Disk Prize (Japanese link)

References

Toshiko Akiyoshi – Lew Tabackin Big Band albums
1976 albums